Dong-soo is a Korean masculine given name. Its meaning depends on the hanja used to write each syllable of the name. There are 24 hanja with the reading "dong" and 67 hanja with the reading "soo" on the South Korean government's official list of hanja which may be registered for use in given names.
 
People with this name include:

Baek Dong-soo (1743–1816), Joseon Dynasty swordsman and martial artist who became the bodyguard of King Jeongjo
Choi Dong-soo (baseball) (born 1971), South Korean baseball first baseman and manager
Choi Dong-soo (footballer) (born 1985), South Korean football forward (Indonesia Super League)
Kim Dong-soo (baseball) (born 1968), South Korean baseball catcher and manager
Kim Dong-soo (canoeist) (born 1969), South Korean canoeist
Kim Dong-soo (esports player) (born 1981), South Korean professional StarCraft player
Lee Dong-soo (born 1974), South Korean badminton player 
Lee Dong-soo (footballer) (born 1994), South Korean football midfielder (K League Challenge)

See also
List of Korean given names

References

Korean masculine given names